Astralium calcar is a species of sea snail, a marine gastropod mollusk in the family Turbinidae, the turban snails.

Description
The height of the shell is 28 mm, its diameter 40 mm. The conoid shell is more or less depressed at the apex. Its color pattern is grayish greenish, or brownish cinereous. The six whorls are flattened above, and radiately plicate, the folds rather unequal and irregular. The periphery is carinated spinose, bearing about twelve radiating more or less foliated spines upon the body whorl. This body whorl descends deeply toward the aperture. The convex base is concentrically more or less densely squamosely lirate. The outer lirae are generally prominent and subspinose, sometimes causing the periphery to appear bicarinate. The aperture is transversely oval, very oblique, generally golden within, and stained with purple or blue on the columella.

Distribution
This marine species occurs off the Philippines, Indo-Malaysia and Queensland, Australia.

References

 Linnaeus, C. 1758. Systemae naturae per regna tria naturae, secundum classes, ordines, genera, species, cum characteribus, differetiis, synonymis, locis.v. Holmiae : Laurentii Salvii 824 pp.
 Habe, T. 1964. Shells of the Western Pacific in color. Osaka : Hoikusha Vol. 2 233 pp., 66 pls.
 Hinton, A. 1972. Shells of New Guinea and the Central Indo-Pacific. Milton : Jacaranda Press xviii 94 pp.
 Coleman, N. 1975. What shell is that? Sydney : Lansdowne Press 298 pp.
 Williams, S.T. (2007). Origins and diversification of Indo-West Pacific marine fauna: evolutionary history and biogeography of turban shells (Gastropoda, Turbinidae). Biological Journal of the Linnean Society, 2007, 92, 573–592.

calcar
Gastropods described in 1758
Taxa named by Carl Linnaeus